Willie Ryan may refer to:

 Willie Ryan (jockey) (born 1964), flat racing jockey from Ireland
 Willie Ryan (Limerick hurler) (1894–?), Irish hurler for Limerick
 Willie Ryan (rower) (born 1953), Irish Olympic rower
 Willie Ryan (Tipperary hurler) (born 1984), Irish hurler for Toomevara and Tipperary

See also
William Ryan (disambiguation)